The Battle of Nuits-Saint-Georges was a battle in the Franco-Prussian War, which took place on December 18, 1870. In this battle, the Baden Division of Germany commanded by General Adolf von Glümer and the XIV Legion under the command of General August von Werder, has won the position in Nuits from the French army led by General Camille Crémer, forced the French army to withdraw overnight with heavy losses for both sides. Glümer himself was also slightly wounded in this engagement, while the defeat of the French army in the fierce battle at Nuits Saint George resulted in the loss of much of their equipment to the German army. Cremer is credited with fighting with great courage in this battle, but not with leadership.

The Battle
During the invasion of Eastern France, General Werder sent General Adolf von Glümer and the Baden Division to Beaune, to conduct an armed reconnaissance south of Dijon. At the same time, the French forces led by Camille Crémer were also en route from Dijon to Beaune in the north. Glümer dragged his two Baden brigades to the town of Nuits and discovered a substantial enemy force was stationed there, and the German and French armies clashed together in the vineyards around Nuits St. Georges. At Boncourt-le-Bois, near Nuits to the east, the German advance met strong French resistance, but by noon the Germans had taken control of the area. With the support of artillery batteries in the hills west of Nuits, the French army made a fierce defense of the railway section through the mountains and near Meuzin. When Baden's main force arrived at 2 p.m., Glümer launched a general offensive. The German infantry forces swept through a wide open plain, and the French which had established positions and fired a short-range assault which has caused heavy losses for the Germans, especially in the ranks of officers. A close skirmish broke out between the two factions, and the fierce battle ended with the German army capturing the town of Nuits and the garrison, driving the French garrison from their strong positions in the town. Both sides were exhausted from the battle.

Aftermath
The French army, in addition to more than 1,000 casualties, also lost thousands more prisoners and deserted. While the French retreated to Châlons-sur-Saone, the Baden army remained in Nuits and the villages to the east that night. Neither side wanted to fight another battle. However, Nuits was in a disadvantageous position and the Germans plans did not require them to hold Nuits, so on the 19th of December, the Germans withdrew after the French were certain to have been absent. In Lyons, news of Cremer's defeat sparked riots.

References

1870 in France
Nuits Saint Georges
Nuits Saint Georges
Nuits Saint Georges
Nuits Saint Georges
December 1870 events